A - B - C - D - E - F - G - H - I - J - K - L - M - N - O - P - Q - R - S - T - U - V - W - XYZ

This is a list of rivers in the United States that have names starting with the letter S.  For the main page, which includes links to listings by state, see List of rivers in the United States.

Sab - Sak
Sabine River - Texas, Louisiana
Sac River - Missouri
Sacagawea River - Montana
Sacandaga River - New York
Saco River - New Hampshire, Maine
Sacramento River - California
Saddle River - New York, New Jersey
Sagavanirktok River - Alaska
Saginaw River - Michigan
St. Clair River - Michigan
St. Croix River - Maine
St. Croix River - Wisconsin, Minnesota
St. Francis River - Maine
St. Francis River - Minnesota
St. Francis River - Missouri, Arkansas
St. Joe River - Idaho
St. John River - Maine
St. Johns River - Florida
St. Jones River - Delaware
St. Joseph River (Lake Michigan) - Michigan, Indiana
St. Joseph River (Maumee River) - Michigan, Ohio, Indiana
St. Lawrence River - New York
St. Louis River - Minnesota, Wisconsin
St. Lucie River - Florida
St. Maries River - Idaho
St. Marks River - Florida
St. Martin River - Maryland
St. Mary River - Montana
St. Marys River - Florida, Georgia
St. Marys River - Indiana, Ohio
St. Marys River - Maryland
St. Marys River - Michigan
St. Regis River - Montana
St. Regis River - New York
St. Vrain Creek or St. Vrain River - Colorado
Sakonnet River - Rhode Island

Sal - Sam
Salado Creek - Texas
Salamonie River - Indiana
Salcha River - Alaska
Salem River - New Jersey
Salinas River - California
Saline River - Arkansas, a tributary of the Little River
Saline River - Arkansas, a tributary of the Ouachita River
Saline River - Illinois
Salkehatchie River - South Carolina
Sallisaw Creek - Oklahoma
Salmon River - Alaska
Salmon River - California
Salmon River - Connecticut
Salmon River - Idaho
Salmon River - New York
Salmon River (Clackamas County, Oregon) - northern Oregon
Salmon River (Lincoln County, Oregon) - northwestern Oregon
Salmon River - Washington
Salmon Falls River - New Hampshire, Maine
Salmon Trout River - Michigan
Salmonberry River - Oregon
Salt Creek - Illinois
Salt Fork Arkansas River - Kansas, Oklahoma
Salt Fork Red River - Oklahoma
Salt Fork Vermilion River - Illinois
Salt Lick Creek - Pennsylvania
Salt River - Arizona
Salt River - Kentucky
Salt River - Michigan
Salt River - Wyoming
Saltlick Creek - West Virginia
Saluda River - South Carolina
Samish River - Washington
Sammamish River - Washington
Sampit River - South Carolina

San - Sax
San Antonio River - California
San Antonio River - Texas
San Benito River - California
San Bernard River - Texas
San Diego River - California
San Francisco River - New Mexico, Arizona
San Gabriel River - California
San Gabriel River - Texas
San Gorgonio River - California
San Jacinto River - California
San Jacinto River - Texas
San Joaquin River - California
San Juan River - Colorado, New Mexico, Utah
San Lorenzo River - California
San Luis Rey River - California
San Marcos River - Texas
San Miguel River - Colorado
San Pedro River - Arizona
San Rafael River - Utah
San Saba River - Texas
Sancho Creek - West Virginia
Sand Fork - West Virginia
Sand Hill River - Minnesota
Sand River - Wisconsin
Sandusky River - Ohio
Sandy Creek - Ohio
Sandy Creek - Pennsylvania
Sandy Creek - West Virginia
Sandy River - Oregon
Sandy River - South Carolina
Sangamon River - Illinois
Sanpoil River - Washington
Santa Ana River - California
Santa Clara River - California
Santa Cruz River - Arizona
Santa Fe River - Florida
Santa Fe River - New Mexico
Santa Margarita River - California
Santa Maria River - Arizona
Santa Ynez River - California
Santee River - South Carolina
Santiam River - Oregon
Santuit River - Massachusetts
Saranac River - New York
Sassafras River - Delaware, Maryland
Satilla River - Georgia
Satucket River - Massachusetts
Saugatuck River - Connecticut
Saugatucket River - Rhode Island
Saugus River - Massachusetts
Sauk River - Minnesota
Sauk River - Washington
Savage River - Maryland
Savannah River - Georgia, South Carolina
Saw Kill (Esopus Creek tributary) - New York
Saw Kill (Hudson River tributary) - New York
Saw Mill River - New York
Sawyer River - New Hampshire
Saxtons River - Vermont

Sc
Scantic River - Massachusetts, Connecticut
Scarborough River - Maine
Schoharie Creek - New York
Schoolcraft River - Minnesota
Schroon River - New York
Schuylkill River - Pennsylvania
Scioto River - Ohio
Scott River - California
Scuppernong River - North Carolina
Scuppernong River - Wisconsin

Se
Sebasticook River - Maine
Second River - New Jersey
Second Broad River - North Carolina
Seekonk River - Rhode Island
Segreganset River - Massachusetts
Sekiu River - Washington
Selawik River - Alaska
Selway River - Idaho
Semem Creek - Montana
Seneca Creek - Maryland
Seneca Creek - West Virginia
Seneca River - New York
Sepulga River - Alabama
Sequatchie River - Tennessee
Sespe Creek - California
Seven Mile River - central Massachusetts
Seven Mile River - Massachusetts, Rhode Island
Severn River - Maryland
Sevier River - Utah

Sh
Shade River - Ohio
Shark River - Florida
Shark River - New Jersey
Shasta River - California
Shavers Fork of the Cheat River - West Virginia
Shawangunk Kill - New York
Shawsheen River - Massachusetts
Sheboygan River - Wisconsin
Sheenjek River - Alaska
Shell Creek - Wyoming
Shell River - Minnesota
Shell Rock River - Minnesota, Iowa
Shelldrake River - Michigan
Shenandoah River - Virginia, West Virginia
Shenango River - Pennsylvania, Ohio
Shepards River - Maine, New Hampshire
Shetucket River - Connecticut
Sheyenne River - North Dakota
Shiawassee River - Michigan
Shields River - Montana
Shioc River - Wisconsin
Ship Creek - Alaska
Shoshone River - Wyoming
Shrewsbury River - New Jersey
Shumatuscacant River - Massachusetts

Si
Siletz River - Oregon
Siltcoos River - Oregon
Silver Creek - Arizona
Silver Creek - Indiana
Silver Creek - Kentucky
Silvies River - Oregon
Similkameen River - Washington
Simms Stream - New Hampshire
Simons River - Delaware
Simpson Creek - West Virginia
Sinsinawa River - Wisconsin, Illinois
Sioux River - Wisconsin
Sippican River - Massachusetts
Sipsey River - Alabama
Sipsey Fork of the Black Warrior River - Alabama
Siskiwit River - Wisconsin
Sisquoc River - California
Siuslaw River - Oregon
Six Mile Creek - Alaska
Six Run Creek - North Carolina
Sixes River - Oregon
Sixteen Mile Creek - Montana

Sk-Sl
Skagit River - Washington
Skillet Fork - Illinois
Skipanon River - Oregon
Skokie River - Illinois
Skokomish River - Washington
Skookumchuck River - Washington
Skug River - Massachusetts
Skuna River - Mississippi
Skunk River - Iowa
Skwentna River - Alaska
Skykomish River - Washington
Slab Fork - West Virginia
Sleepy Creek - Virginia, West Virginia
Sligo Creek - Maryland
Slippery Rock Creek - Pennsylvania
Slough Creek - Montana, Wyoming

Sm-Sn
Smith River - California
Smith River - Montana
Smith River - New Hampshire
Smith River - Oregon
Smith River - Virginia, North Carolina
Smithers Creek - West Virginia
Smoky Hill River - Colorado, Kansas
Smyrna River - Delaware
Snake River - Wyoming, Idaho, Oregon, Washington
Snake River - Colorado
Snake River - Minnesota (Elk River tributary)
Snake River - Minnesota (Red River tributary)
Snake River - Minnesota (St. Croix River tributary)
Snake River - Nebraska
Snohomish River - Washington
Snoqualmie River - Washington

So
Sol Duc River - Washington
Soldier River - Iowa
Somo River - Wisconsin
Sonoita Creek - Arizona
Sopchoppy River - Florida
Soque River - Georgia
Soucook River - New Hampshire
Souhegan River - New Hampshire
Souris River - North Dakota
South River - Iowa
South River - Maryland
South River - New Hampshire, Maine
South River - New Jersey, tributary of Great Egg Harbor River
South River - New Jersey, Raritan River tributary
South River - North Carolina, tributary of Black River
South River - North Carolina, tributary of Neuse River
South River - Virginia
South Anna River - Virginia
South Branch Ashuelot River - New Hampshire
South Branch Baker River - New Hampshire
South Branch Metedeconk River - New Jersey
South Branch Pawtuxet River - Rhode Island
South Branch Piscataquog River - New Hampshire
South Branch Potomac River - Virginia, West Virginia
South Branch Raritan River - New Jersey
South Concho River - Texas
South Fork Grand River - South Dakota
South Fork Humboldt River - Nevada
South Fork John Day River - Oregon
South Fork Kentucky River - Kentucky
South Fork Musselshell River - Montana
South Fork New River - North Carolina
South Fork Republican River - Colorado, Kansas, Nebraska
South Fork Shenandoah River - Virginia
South Fork Solomon River - Kansas
South Fork South Branch Potomac River - West Virginia
South Fork South Platte River - Colorado
South Platte River - Colorado, Nebraska
South Santiam River - Oregon
South Umpqua River - Oregon
South Yamhill River - Oregon

Sp-Sq
Spanish Fork - Utah
Spicket River - New Hampshire, Massachusetts
Spirit River - Wisconsin
Spokane River - Idaho, Washington
Spoon River - Illinois
Sprague River - Maine
Sprague River - Oregon
Spring Creek - Minnesota
Spring Creek - North Dakota
Spring Creek - West Virginia
Spring River - Arkansas, Missouri
Spring River - Missouri, Kansas, Oklahoma
Spruce River - Wisconsin
Squam River - New Hampshire
Squamscott River - New Hampshire
Squannacook River - Massachusetts
Squaw Creek - Iowa
Squaw Creek - Oregon
Squirrel River - Alaska

St
Stanislaus River - California
Steer Creek - West Virginia
Stehekin River - Washington
Steinhatchee River - Florida
Sticky River - Maine
Stikine River - Alaska
Still River - Connecticut
Stillaguamish River - Washington
Stillwater River - Massachusetts
Stillwater River - southern Montana
Stillwater River - western Montana
Stillwater River - Ohio
Stillwater River - Rhode Island
Stinking River - Virginia
Stonecoal Creek - West Virginia
Stones River - Tennessee
Stonycreek River - Pennsylvania
Stono River - South Carolina
Stony Brook - New Hampshire
Stony River - Alaska
Stony River - West Virginia
Stop River - Massachusetts
Straight River - Minnesota, tributary of Fish Hook River
Straight River - Minnesota, tributary of Cannon River
Straight River - Wisconsin
Strawberry River - Arkansas
Strong River - Mississippi
Stroudwater River - Maine
Stuck River - Washington
Styx River - Alabama

Su
Suamico River - Wisconsin
Sucarnoochee River - Alabama
Sudbury River - Massachusetts
Sugar Creek (Driftwood River) - Indiana
Sugar Creek (Wabash River) - Indiana
Sugar Creek (Ottawa River) - Ohio
Sugar Creek (Tuscarawas River) - Ohio
Sugar Creek - West Virginia
Sugar River - New Hampshire
Sugar River - Wisconsin, Illinois
Suiattle River - Washington
Sulphur River - Texas, Arkansas
Sumas River - Washington
Sun River - Montana
Suncook River - New Hampshire
Sunday Creek - Ohio
Sunday River - Maine
Sunflower River - Mississippi
Sunrise River - Minnesota
Susan River - California
Susitna River - Alaska
Susquehanna River - New York, Pennsylvania, Maryland
Suwannee River - Georgia, Florida

Sw-Sz
Swamp Creek - Wisconsin
Swan River - Colorado
Swan River - Minnesota
Swan River - Montana
Swannanoa River - North Carolina
Swanson River - Alaska
Swatara Creek - Pennsylvania
Sweeny Pond River - Wisconsin
Sweet Grass Creek - Montana
Sweetwater Creek - Georgia
Sweetwater River - California
Sweetwater River - Wyoming
Swift River - Alaska
Swift River - Massachusetts
Swift River - New Hampshire, tributary of Bearcamp River
Swift River - New Hampshire, tributary of Saco River
Swift Diamond River - New Hampshire
Swimming River - New Jersey
Sycan River - Oregon
Sycamore Creek (Contra Costa County) - California
Sycamore Creek (Kings River) - California
Sycamore Creek (Santa Clara County) - California
Sycamore Creek - Michigan
Sycamore Creek - Texas
Symmes Creek - Ohio

S